Uniformat is a standard for classifying building specifications, cost estimating, and cost analysis in the U.S. and Canada. The elements are major components common to most buildings. The system can be used to provide consistency in the economic evaluation of building projects. It was developed through an industry and government consensus and has been widely accepted as an ASTM standard.

History

Hanscomb Associates, a cost consultant, developed a system called MASTERCOST in 1973 for the American Institute of Architects (AIA). The U.S. General Services Administration (GSA), which is responsible for government buildings, was also developing a system. The AIA and GSA agreed on a system and named it UNIFORMAT. The AIA included it in their practice on construction management, and the GSA included it in their project estimating requirements. In 1989, ASTM International began developing a standard for classifying building elements, based on UNIFORMAT. It was renamed to UNIFORMAT II. In 1995, the Construction Specifications Institute (CSI) and Construction Specifications Canada (CSC) began to revise Uniformat. UniFormat is now a registered trademark of CSI and CSC and was most recently published in 2010.

A new strategy to classify the built environment, named OmniClass, incorporates the elemental building classification in its Table 21 Elements. The numbering system is changed in OmniClass.

Uniformat level 1 categories

A  SUBSTRUCTURE     
B  SHELL
C  INTERIORS
D  SERVICES
E  EQUIPMENT AND FURNISHINGS
F  SPECIAL CONSTRUCTION AND DEMOLITION
G  BUILDING SITEWORK

Uniformat levels 2 and 3 categories
An example of how the numbering system expands to provide additional detail below level 1 is shown for
A SUBSTRUCTURE
   A10 Foundations
        A1010 Standard Foundations
        A1020 Special Foundations
        A1030 Slab on Grade
   A20 Basement Construction
        A2010 Basement Excavation
        A2020 Basement Walls

CSI/CSC UniFormat level 1 numbers and titles 
PROJECT DESCRIPTION     
A  SUBSTRUCTURE     
B  SHELL
C  INTERIORS
D  SERVICES
E  EQUIPMENT AND FURNISHINGS
F  SPECIAL CONSTRUCTION AND DEMOLITION
G  BUILDING SITEWORK
Z  GENERAL

References

External links
 Construction Specifications Canada (CSC)
 Specifications Institute (CSI)

Construction documents